The Bangladesh Liberation War started on 26 March 1971 and ended on 16 December 1971. Some of the major events of the war are listed in the timeline below.

Timeline
Interactive Timeline of the Bangladesh Liberation War

Before the war
1 March: General Yahya Khan calls off the session of National Council to be held on 3 March in a radio address.
7 March: Sheikh Mujibur Rahman – leader of Awami League party that had won a landslide victory in Pakistan in the Federal Elections of 1970, but never been granted authority – announces to a jubilant crowd at the Dhaka Race Course ground, "The struggle this time is the struggle for our emancipation! The struggle this time is the struggle for independence!".
9 March: Workers of Chittagong port refuse to unload weapons from the ship 'Swat'.
16 March: Yahya Khan starts negotiation with Sheikh Mujibur Rahman.
19 March: Nearly 200 people are injured at Jaydevpur during clashes between protesters and the Pakistan Army.
24 March: The Pakistan Army opens fire on Bengali protesters in Syedpur and Rangpur. About 150 people are killed.

Events during the War

March
25 March to 26 March: Pakistan Army starts genocide in the form of Operation Searchlight in Dhaka and the rest of the country, attacking general civilians, political activists, students, and Bengali members of armed forces and police.
26 March: At 1.15 am, Sheikh Mujibur Rahman is arrested by the Pakistani 3 commando unit. The Independence of Bangladesh is declared by Sheikh Mujibiur Rahman a few minutes before he was arrested by the Pakistani army. At 2.30 pm The Independence of Bangladesh was declared by Awami league leader of Chittagong M. A. Hannan on behalf of Bangobondhu Sheikh Mujibur Rahman from Kalurghat. This is Bangladesh's official Independence Day.
27 March: Independence of Bangladesh is again declared by Maj. Ziaur Rahman on behalf of Sheikh Mujibur Rahman.
31 March: Kushtia resistance begins.

April
2 April: Jinjira massacre.
6 April: The Blood Telegram
11 April: Radio address by Tajuddin Ahmad, the Prime Minister of Bangladesh.
10 April: A provisional Bangladesh government-in-exile is formed.
12 April: M. A. G. Osmani takes up the command of Bangladesh Armed Forces.
17 April: A provisional government-in-exile took oath in Baidyanathtala (now called Mujibnagar) in Meherpur District
18 April: Battle of Daruin, Comilla and Battle of Rangamati-Mahalchari waterway, Chittagong Hill Tracts.
24 April: Formation of Bangladesh Action Committee at Coventry, UK by non-resident Bangladeshis.
25 April to 15 August: Operation Jackpot by Mukti Bahini 
28 April: Tajuddin pleas for arms aid to neighbors.

May
5 May: Gopalpur massacre.
15 May: Indian army starts aiding Mukti Bahini.
20 May:The Chuknagar massacre takes place at Khulna where the Pakistan army kills nearly 10 thousand people
24 May: Swadhin Bangla Betar Kendra finds home in Kolkata.

July
 11–17 July: Sector Commanders Conference in 1971.

August
1 August: The Concert for Bangladesh in Madison Square Garden, New York by Ravi Shankar, George Harrison and friends.
16 August: Operation Jackpot, Bangladesh naval commando operation.
20 August: Flight Lieutenant Matiur Rahman's attempt to defect by hijacking a fighter.
30 August: Pakistan Army crackdown on Dhaka guerrillas.

September
5 September: Battle of Goahati, Jessore.
28 September: Bangladesh Air Force starts functioning.

October
13 October: Dhaka guerrillas kill Abdul Monem Khan, governor of East Pakistan.
28 October to 3 November: Battle of Dhalai in which 3 companies (215 soldiers) of the Jat Regiment (2 JAT) of Indian Army defeated a battalion (800 soldiers) of 30th Frontier Force Rifles (30 FFR) of Pakistan Army. Hamidur Rahman of Mukti Bahini was posthumously awarded the Bir Sreshtho, the highest recognition of bravery in Bangladesh.
31 October to 3 November: Battle of Dhalai: Allied attack from Tripura into East Pakistan to stop Pakistani cross-border shelling.

November
9 November: Six small ships constitute the first fleet of Bangladesh Navy.
16 November: Battle of Ajmiriganj, an 18-hour encounter between Mukti Bahini and Pakistan army. A famous freedom fighter, Jagatyoti Das, is killed.
14 November to 4 December: The Battle of Kamalpur began, where Pakistani troops defended Kamalpur for 21 days before being ordered to surrender by their superiors.  
20 to 21 November: Battle of Garibpur: India attacked Pakistani forces and captured Boyra salient in East Pakistan
21 November: Bangladesh Armed Forces are formed.
22 November to 13 December, and sporadic fighting to 16 December: Battle of Hilli: Indian attack on Bogra in East Pakistan.

December
3 December: Bangladesh Air Force destroys Pakistani oil depots. 
3 December: Pakistani pre-emptive airstrikes in India. As a result, India declares war against Pakistan.
3 to 6 December: Battle of Chamb; Pakistan attacks and takes over part of southern Kashmir from India.
4 December : Battle of Longewala; India stops a Pakistani invasion directed at Jaisalmer.
4 to 5 December : Battle of Gazipur in which Indian Army and Mukti Bahini captured Gazipur
5 December : Battle of Basantar; India attacks and takes over Pakistani territory in the Shakargarh Salient, opposite Jammu.
6 December: Jashore (Jessore) became the first district in Bangladesh to gain independence. Bhutan becomes the first country to recognise Bangladesh after India. Swadhin Bangla Betar Kendra becomes Bangladesh Betar.
7 to 16 December: Battle of Sylhet, liberation of Jessore, Sylhet and Moulovi Bazar.
8 December: Operation Python: Indian naval attack on Karachi, West Pakistan.
9 December: Battle of Kushtia: Indian attack from West Bengal into East Pakistan. Chandpur and Daudkandi liberated from Pakistan.
9 December: Meghna Heli Bridge liberated from Pakistan
10 December: Liberation of Laksham. Two Bangladeshi ships sunk mistakenly by an Indian air attack.
11 December: Tangail Airdrop, which liberated Poongli Bridge on the Jamuna river
11 December: Liberation of Hilli, Mymenshingh, Kushtia and Noakhali. USS Enterprise is deployed by the US Navy in the Bay of Bengal to intimidate the Indian Navy.
13 December: Soviet Navy deploys a group of warships to counter Enterprise. The Enterprise moves towards Southeast Asia, averting a confrontation.
14 December: Selective genocide of Bengali nationalist intellectuals. Liberation of Bogra.
16 December: End of the Bangladesh Liberation War. Mitro Bahini takes Dhaka. Pakistan Army surrenders to Mitro Bahini represented by Jagjit Singh Aurora of the Indian Army faction of the military coalition.
22 December: The provisional government of Bangladesh arrives in Dhaka from exile.

See also

History of Bangladesh
Timeline of Bangladeshi history
Indo-Pakistani War of 1971
 Mitro Bahini order of battle
 Pakistan Army order of battle, December 1971
 Evolution of Pakistan Eastern Command plan
 Military plans of the Bangladesh Liberation War
 Indo-Pakistani wars and conflicts
List of timelines
 Bangladesh Liberation War Library and Research Centre, a Digital Library, working to 'preserve and publicly distribute' the historical documents regarding the Liberation War of Bangladesh and Genocide of Innocent Bengali People in 1971.

References

Bangladesh Liberation War